Sarh Airport  is an airport serving Sarh, Chad.

References

Airports in Chad
Moyen-Chari Region